Pseudoligostigma boliviensis is a moth in the family Crambidae. It was described by Eugene G. Munroe in 1964. It is found in Bolivia.

References

Glaphyriinae
Moths described in 1964